Erumalainaickenpatti is a village in Periyakulam Block in Theni District of Tamil Nadu State, India.It is located 26 km towards East from District headquarters Theni.       10 km from Periyakulam.505 km  from State capital Chennai.

References

Villages in Theni district